Notable criminally-active gangs in Mexico include:

Beltrán-Leyva Cartel
Gulf Cartel
Juárez Cartel
Los Ántrax
Los Negros
Los Zetas
Sinaloa Cartel 
Sonora Cartel
Paisas
Mexican Mafia
Sureños, US-Mexican gang
Nuestra Familia
Nortenos, US-Mexican gang
Tijuana Cartel

See also
 List of gangs in the United States
 Gangs in Australia
 Gangs in Canada
 Gangs in the United Kingdom
 Gangs in New Zealand

 
Mexico